Muhammad bin Ahmed bin Juzayy Al Gharnati  was an Andalusian Maliki-Ash'ari scholar and poet of Arab origin.

Works 
He wrote many religious works such as his al-Qawanin al-Fiqhiyyah or "The Laws of Jurisprudence"  a comparative manual of the jurisprudence of the four Sunni madhhabs (Maliki, Hanafi, Shafi`i, Hanbali) with emphasis on the Maliki school and notices of the views of the Ẓāhirī school and others.  He is also noted for his tafsir of the Qur'an al-Tashil li Ulum al-Tanzil,  his book on legal theory Taqrīb al-Wuṣūl ‘ilā ‘Ilm al-Uṣūl or The Nearest of Paths to the Knowledge of the Fundamentals of Islamic Jurisprudence, which he wrote for his son, as well as his treatise on Sufism based on the Qur'an, The Refinement of the Hearts.

Family 
He had three sons. His son Abu Abdullah Ibn Juzayy is mainly known as the writer to whom Ibn Battuta dictated an account of his travels. He wrote "The Travels of Ibn Battuta" (Riḥlat Ibn Baṭūṭah) in 1352-55. It is clear that he copied passages from previous works such as the  description of Medina from the Rihla of Ibn Jubayr and the description of Palestine by Mohammed al-Abdari al-Hihi.

See also 

 List of Ash'aris and Maturidis

References

Bibliography 
Ibn Juzayy, Muhammad ibn Ahmad, [https://archive.org/details/ibndjuzay-tasfiatalqulub Tasfiyat al-qulub fi al-wusul ila hadrat 'Allam al-Ghuyub / li-Ibn Juzayy al-Gharnati ; dirasat wa-tahqiq Munir al-Qadiri Bu Dashish ; taqdim Ahmad al-Tawfiq. al-Tab'ah 1.']' [Casablanca : s.n.], 1998   
M. Isabel Calero Secall,  RULERS AND QĀDĪS: THEIR RELATIONSHIP DURING THE NASRID KINGDOM, in: Journal	Islamic Law and Society, Volume 7, Number 2 / June, 2000
Ibn al-Khatib, al-Ihata fi akhbar Gharnata, ed. M. Inan, 4 vols. (Cairo, 1973-77), I, 157-62;
Ibn al-Khatib, al-Katiba al-kamina, ed. Ihsan Abbas,(Beirut, 1983), 138-43 
Ibn al-Khatib, al-Lamha al-badriyya fi l-dawla al-nasriyya, ed. Muhibb al-Din al-Khatib, 3rd ed. (Beirut, 1978),  116-18
Al-Maqqari Nafh al-tib min ghusn al-Andalus al-ratib'', ed. I. 'Abbas, Beirut, 1968, t. 8, pp. 40-54
F.Velazquez Basanta, Retrato jatibiano de Abu Bakr Ya'far Ahmad ibn Yuzayy, otro poeta y qadi al-yama'a de Granada. Anales de la Universidad de Cadiz, IX-X (1992-93), 39-51
Maria Arcas Campoy, Un tratado de derecho comparado: el Kitàb al-Qawànìn de Ibn Juzayy, pp. 49-57, In: Atti del XIII Congresso dell'Union Européenne d'Arabisants et d'Islamisants (Venezia 1986)he was the one who Ibn Battuta dedicated his life and works to.

Asharis
Quranic exegesis scholars
Maliki scholars from al-Andalus
Poets from al-Andalus
14th-century Moroccan poets
14th-century Moroccan historians
Moroccan scholars
People from Fez, Morocco
Banu Kalb
1321 births
1357 deaths
14th-century Arabic poets